Valik-e Sofla (also Romanized as Valīk-e Soflá; also known as Valīk-e Pā’īn) is a village in Dabuy-ye Jonubi Rural District, Dabudasht District, Amol County, Mazandaran Province, Iran. At the 2006 census, its population was 320, in 86 families.

References 

Populated places in Amol County